Steven M. Crawford (born July 13, 1959) is an American politician. He was a member of the cabinet of former Pennsylvania Governor Ed Rendell.

He graduated from the Mansfield University of Pennsylvania in 1981.

He was appointed to be chief of staff for Pennsylvania Governor Ed Rendell in May 2009 to replace the outgoing Gregory Fajt. He served as secretary of legislative affairs from 2003 through 2009. Prior to that, he was a staff member in the Pennsylvania House of Representatives. Prior to that, he was Deputy Secretary of the Pennsylvania Department of Agriculture under Governor Bob Casey Sr.

He was named to the Pennsylvania Report "PA Report 100" list of politically influential personalities in 2009. He was named to the PoliticsPA "Power 50" list.

References

Living people
1959 births
Chiefs of staff to United States state governors
State cabinet secretaries of Pennsylvania
Pennsylvania Democrats
Mansfield University of Pennsylvania alumni
Employees of the Pennsylvania General Assembly